The 2011–12 Marshall Thundering Herd men's basketball team represented Marshall University in the 2011–12 college basketball season as a member of Conference USA (C-USA). They played their home games at the Cam Henderson Center and were led by second year head coach Tom Herrion.

Preseason

Recruiting

Roster

Schedule 

|-
!colspan=9| Exhibition

|-
!colspan=9| Regular season

|-

|-

|-

|-
!colspan=9| 2012 C-USA Basketball tournament

|-
!colspan=9| 2012 National Invitation Tournament

References

Marshall Thundering Herd men's basketball seasons
Marshall
Marshall
Marsh
Marsh